Inferno (also released as Operation Cobra) is a 1997 feature film directed by Fred Olen Ray starring Don Wilson, Deepti Bhatnagar and R. Madhavan. Evan Lurie, Michael Cavanaugh and Tané McClure appear in other pivotal roles. This is the debut film of R. Madhavan.

Plot synopsis
Don Wilson plays Kyle Connors, an Interpol agent who travels to India on a mission of revenge against the terrorist that killed his partner.

Cast
 Don "The Dragon" Wilson as Kyle Connors 
 Deepti Bhatnagar as Shalimar
 R. Madhavan as Ravi
 Evan Lurie as Johan Davaad
 Richard Hill as Trevor
 Tane McClure as Callista
 Michael Cavanaugh as Grayson
 Jillian Kesner as Jasmine

Production
Don Wilson worked on the script of the film with director Fred Olen Ray and producers Ashok Amritraj and Sunanda Murali Manohar during early 1996, before beginning the shoot at MGR Film City in Chennai, India in July. Filming for the first time in India, Ray recruited local Indian actors including actor R. Madhavan and actress Deepti Bhatnagar to portray roles in the project.

Release
The film is reported to have done average business as a result of its video release.

The film was later dubbed into Tamil as Vegham in 2001, to capitalize on Madhavan's new-found fame after Alaipayuthey. Madhavan expressed his disappointment at film distributors for trying to pass the project off as a straight Tamil film. Golden Lotus Entertainments dubbed and released the film in Telugu as Secret Agent 786, with dialogue by Malluri Venkat and editing by Trinath.

References

External links

1997 films
1990s action films
American independent films
American martial arts films
1990s English-language films
Films directed by Fred Olen Ray
1997 martial arts films
Films about Interpol
1997 independent films
1990s American films